Stadionul Municipal is a multi-purpose stadium in Salonta, Romania. It is mostly used for football matches and is the home ground of Olimpia Salonta. The stadium holds about 1,200 people.

A full-size artificial turf pitch was created at the facility in 2006.

Events

Association football

References

External links
 Stadionul Municipal (Salonta) on soccerway.com

See also

Football venues in Romania
Buildings and structures in Bihor County
Salonta